Haryana Steelers (HAR) is a Kabaddi team based in Panchkula, Haryana that plays in the Pro Kabaddi League. The team is currently led by Meetu Sharma and coached by Manpreet Singh. The team is owned by JSW Sports, part of the Jindal South West (JSW) Group. The Steelers play their home matches at Tau Devi Lal Stadium (Panchkula).

The Steelers had a good start to life in the PKL as they reached the playoffs in their debut 2017 season, but the success was short-lived, as the team finished in the bottom of Zone A in the following 2018-19 season.

Haryana Steelers had a tremendous start in the  PKL 2019. They made their claim for the title by making it to the playoffs due to their strong Raiders. But Haryana Steelers stayed away from the trophy due to their defense glitch in the eliminator against U Mumba. Overall 2019 season was one of the best season for team. The coach of the team Rakesh Kumar also made his name as a successful coach of Pro Kabaddi League by making team to Playoffs.

Current squad

Identity

New logo    
The brand-new logo, which is a dynamically posed Bhima wielding his heavy Gada (mace), powerfully leaning forward with his arm and reaching out strikingly, exemplifies Haryana Steelers' core values of resilience, strength and tenacity. The logo also captures the action and emotion of an energetic and fierce warrior, be it on the battleground or on the Kabaddi mat.

Seasons

Season V

Season VI

Season VII

Season VIII

Season IX

Records

Overall results Pro Kabbaddi season

By opposition
''Note: Table lists in alphabetical order.

Sponsors

References

Pro Kabaddi League teams

Sport in Pune
2014 establishments in Haryana
Kabaddi clubs established in 2014
JSW Group